This is a complete list of the operettas of the Austrian composer Karl Michael Ziehrer (1843–1922).

List

References
Lamb, Andrew (1992), 'Ziehrer, C M' in The New Grove Dictionary of Opera, ed. Stanley Sadie (London) 
Some of the information in this article is taken from the related Dutch Wikipedia article.

External links
Ziehrer Foundation (in English and German)

Lists of operas by composer
 
Lists of compositions by composer